The 2023 Spikers' Turf season is the sixth season of the men's volleyball league Spikers' Turf, the counterpart of the women's Premier Volleyball League (formerly called Shakey's V-League). 

The sixth season started on January 22, 2023, with the launch of the 2023 Spikers' Turf Open Conference.

Open Conference

Participating teams

Preliminary round

Final round

Semifinals

Finals

Awards

Final standings

Conference results

See also 
 2023 Premier Volleyball League season

References 

Spikers' Turf
2023 in Philippine sport
2023 in men's volleyball
SPT